Tina! is a greatest hits album by American singer Tina Turner, released in North America on September 30, 2008, by Capitol Records and in Germany on October 17, 2008 (the album was released as an "import" in other regions). The album was later expanded to a three-disc set titled The Platinum Collection, released in Europe on February 23, 2009, by Parlophone to coincide with the European leg of Turner's tour.

Overview
Released in time for her 2008 world tour, the 18-track disc features Turner's biggest singles along with live recordings. It also includes two new songs, "I'm Ready" and "It Would Be a Crime". The digital release of the album features alternative versions of two songs. The original 1966 version of "River Deep – Mountain High" is replaced with the 1973 re-recording and the "Acid Queen" original soundtrack version with the album version.
 
The album was later expanded to a three-disc set titled The Platinum Collection, released in Europe on February 23, 2009 to coincide with the European leg of her tour. The album features nearly every single released by Turner as a solo artist, including duets, live versions and re-recordings, as well as selected songs from her days with her former husband, Ike Turner.

Track listing
Source:

The Platinum Collection

Charts

Weekly charts

Year-end charts

Certifications

References

2008 compilation albums
2009 compilation albums
Capitol Records compilation albums
Parlophone compilation albums
Tina Turner compilation albums